

This is a list of bridges documented by the Historic American Engineering Record in Puerto Rico.

Bridges

References

External links

 

List
List
Puerto Rico
Bridges, HAER
Bridges, HAER